WFR may refer to:

 Weather Research and Forecasting model
 Wilderness First Responder
 MEMC Electronic Materials, based on its stock symbol on the New York Stock exchange
 The Worcestershire and Sherwood Foresters, an infantry regiment of the British army
 Work Force Reduction (or Work Force Restructuring), a euphemism for layoffs
 Wake Forest-Rolesville High School
 Wizard's First Rule